The track and field competition at the 2002 Central American and Caribbean Games was held at the Estadio Nacional Flor Blanca in San Salvador, El Salvador, between 1 and 6 December 2002. Results were reported and discussed in detail on a day-by-day basis.

Medal summary

Detailed results were published.

Men's events

Women's events

Initially, she was 2nd in the 400m event (53.09s), 1st as member of the 4 × 100m relay team (44.90s), and 2nd as member of the 4 × 400m relay team (3:32.88min).

Medal table

Participation
According to an unofficial count, 282 athletes from 28 countries participated.

 (2)
 (5)
 (8)
 (2)
 (3)
 (2)
 (23)
 (2)
 (25)
 (26)
 (5)
 (23)
 (1)
 (8)
 (1)
 (20)
 (53)
 (5)
 (4)
 (1)
 (22)
 (4)
 (1)
 (1)
 (1)
 (5)
 (5)
 (24)

References

 
 
 
 

Central American and Caribbean Games
2002 Central American and Caribbean Games
Athletics at the Central American and Caribbean Games